Estan Patera is a patera, or a complex crater with scalloped edges, on Jupiter's moon Io. It is named after the Hittite sun god Estan. Its name was adopted by the International Astronomical Union in 2006. It is located at the northern base of the 11-kilometer mountain Gish Bar Mons. Located west-northwest is Skythia Mons, and to the southwest is Monan Mons, at the northern and southern ends of which are Monan Patera and Ah Peku Patera.

References

Volcanoes of Io (moon)